The Malegaon High School is one of the oldest schools in Malegaon in the Indian state of Maharashtra.

Administration
It works under the Anjuman Moinut-Talba Educational Committee (AMTEC).

AMTEC has four other institutions:
IDB Building
A.R.M. Pre-Primary and Primary School, Malegaon (ارم پری پرائمری و پرائمری اسکول، مالیگاؤں)
Dr. P.M. Rahmany Girls' Pre-Primary and Primary School, Malegaon (ڈاکٹر پیر محمد رحمانی گرلس پری پرائمری و پرائمری اسکول، مالیگاؤں)
Dr. P.M. Rahmany Girls' High School, Malegaon (ڈاکٹر پیر محمد رحمانی گرلس ہائی اسکول، مالیگاؤں)

References 

High schools and secondary schools in Maharashtra
Junior colleges in Maharashtra
Education in Nashik district
Malegaon
Educational institutions in India with year of establishment missing